Year 560 (DLX) was a leap year starting on Thursday of the Julian calendar. The denomination 560 for this year has been used since the early medieval period, when the Anno Domini calendar era became the prevalent method in Europe for naming years.

Events 
 By place 
 Europe 
 Alboin succeeds his father Audoin after his death, as king of the Lombards.

 Britain 
 Adda succeeds his brother Glappa as king of Bernicia (approximate date).
 Ælla becomes king of Deira (this according to the Anglo-Saxon Chronicle).
 Ceawlin succeeds his father Cynric as king of Wessex (approximate date).
 Custennin ap Cado abdicates as king of Dumnonia (South West England).
 Elidyr of Strathclyde invades Gwynedd (Wales) and tries to expel his brother-in-law, king Rhun Hir ap Maelgwn.

 By topic 
 Religion 
 Columba quarrels with Finnian of Moville over authorship of a psalter, leading to a pitched battle the next year.

Births 

 Abu Sufyan ibn Harb, Arabic leader (d. 652)
 Constantina, Byzantine empress (approximate date)
 Eustace of Luxeuil, abbot (approximate date)
 Isidore of Seville, archbishop and scholar
 Richarius, Frankish hermit and monk (approximate date)
 Sophronius, patriarch of Jerusalem (d. 638)
 Tassilo I, duke of Bavaria (d. 610)

Deaths 

 Aspasius of Auch, bishop of Éauze 
 Audoin, king of the Lombards (approximate date)
 Chen Chang, prince of the Chen Dynasty (b. 537) 
 Clodoald, Merovingian prince (approximate date) (b. 522)
 Cynric, king of Wessex
 Domitian of Huy, Frankish bishop and saint
 Glappa, king of Bernicia (approximate date)
 Ming Di, emperor of Northern Zhou (b. 534)
 Thurisind, king of the Gepids (approximate date)
 Yang Yin, official of Northern Qi (b. 511)

References